The men's 50m butterfly events at the 2022 World Para Swimming Championships were held at the Penteada Olympic Swimming Complex in Madeira between 12–18 June.

Medalists

Results

S5
Final
Eight swimmers from seven nations took part.

S6

S7

References

2022 World Para Swimming Championships